Frenchay is a place name in England and may refer to:

 Frenchay, Bristol:
 Frenchay Campus, University of the West of England
 Frenchay Hospital
 Frenchay Road, Oxford